Rabah Yassa is an Algerian football player. He is currently playing for JS Kabylie in the Algerian Ligue Professionnelle 1.

Club career
Yassa began his career in the junior ranks of USM Draâ Ben Khedda. In 2006, he joined JS Kabylie. On July 1, 2011, Yassa made his professional debut for JS Kabylie as an 89th-minute substitute in a league match against MC El Eulma.

International career
In February 2010, Yassa was called up to the Algerian Under-20 National Team for a tournament in Dubai.

References

External links
 

Living people
Algerian footballers
Algerian Ligue Professionnelle 1 players
JS Kabylie players
Algeria youth international footballers
Association football midfielders
Year of birth missing (living people)
21st-century Algerian people